Park Jun-Tae (born 2 December 1989) is a South Korean football forward who plays for Hwaseong FC. He has previously played for Ulsan Hyundai, Incheon United and Busan IPark.

Club career

Picked from the K-League draft by Ulsan Hyundai for the 2009 season, Park made the majority of his appearances in 2009 from the bench as a substitute.  He featured in the 2009 AFC Champions League, including a start in Ulsan's away loss to Australian club Newcastle Jets.

After a single match for Ulsan Hyundai in 2010, he then spent the remainder of the 2010 season on loan to National League club Ulsan Hyundai Mipo Dockyard. Park returned to the K-League with a shift to Incheon United for the 2011 season.   On 17 April 2011, Park scored his first professional goal in the dying minutes of the match against Seongnam Ilhwa Chunma, helping his side to a 2 -1 win.

Club career statistics

References

External links

1989 births
Living people
Association football forwards
South Korean footballers
K League 1 players
K League 2 players
Korea National League players
Incheon United FC players
Ulsan Hyundai FC players
Jeonnam Dragons players
Gimcheon Sangmu FC players
Busan IPark players